Amydria brevipennella is a moth of the family Acrolophidae. It is found in North America, including Florida, Maryland, North Carolina, Ohio, Tennessee, Virginia and West Virginia.

References

Moths described in 1905
Acrolophidae